Zahra Airall is a writer, women's rights activist, film maker. director, and playwright from Antigua and Barbuda. She is a founding member of the organization Women of Antigua and is one of their executives. She is the director of the Sugar Apple Theatre in Antigua. She has written plays such as The Forgotten, which was performed in the Caribbean Secondary Schools Drama Festival by Antigua Girls' High School. Airall is one of the contributors to She Sex, a collaborative book with sections written by different Caribbean women. She also writes short stories such as "The Looking Glass". She wrote a specially commissioned monologue for Heather Doram.

Awards
She has won multiple awards at the National Youth Awards (Antigua), including the award for literary arts in 2016 for her involvement in many things over the years including works within the organization Women of Antigua (When a Woman Moans, Vagina Monologues) and August Rush (Expressions). Zahra has produced and scripted stage as well as film/TV content and steps on stage in numerous productions and in from of the camera (on Keeping it Real).

References

Living people
Antigua and Barbuda women writers
Antigua and Barbuda dramatists and playwrights
Women dramatists and playwrights
21st-century women writers
Antigua and Barbuda activists
Women's rights activists
21st-century dramatists and playwrights
Year of birth missing (living people)